This list of the prehistoric life of Ohio contains the various prehistoric life-forms whose fossilized remains have been reported from within the US state of Ohio.

Precambrian
The Paleobiology Database records no known occurrences of Precambrian fossils in Ohio.

Paleozoic

Selected Paleozoic taxa of Ohio

 †Achatella
 †Acidaspis
 †Acleistoceras – tentative report
 †Acutichiton – type locality for genus
 †Adamanterpeton – type locality for genus
 †Adamanterpeton ohioensis – type locality for species
 †Aethaspis
 †Agnesia
  †Alethopteris
 †Ambedus – type locality for genus
 †Amphiscapha
 †Amplexopora
  †Annularia
 †Annularia asteris
 †Annularia radiata
 †Annularia sphenophylloides
 †Annularia stellata
 †Anthracodromeus
 †Anthracodromeus longipes – type locality for species
  †Anthracosaurus
 †Aphlebia
 †Archaeothyris
 †Arctinurus
 †Armenoceras
 †Artisia
 †Asterotheca
 †Athyris
 †Atrypa
  †Atrypa reticularis
 †Atrypa reticularus – report made of unidentified related form or using admittedly obsolete nomenclature
 †Augustoceras
 †Aulopora
 †Aulopora microbuccinata
  †Aviculopecten
 †Aviculopecten appalachianus – type locality for species
 †Aviculopecten columbianus – type locality for species
 †Aviculopecten coxanus
 †Aviculopecten fasciculatus
 †Aviculopecten occidentalis
 †Aviculopecten winchelli
 †Baldwinonus
 †Bellerophon
 †Bellerophon jeffersonensis
 †Bellerophon spergensis
 †Bembexia
 †Bickmorites
  †Brachydectes – type locality for genus
 †Brachydectes newberryi – type locality for species
 †Broiliellus
 †Calamites
 †Calamites carinatus
 †Calamites cisti
 †Calamites suckowi
 †Calamites suckowii
 †Calamites undulatus
 †Callixylon
 †Camarotoechia
  †Cameroceras
 †Catenipora
 †Centroceras
 †Ceratocephala
 †Ceratopsis
 †Ceraurinus
 †Ceraurus
 †Chagrinia
 †Charactoceras
 †Chasmatopora
 †Chasmops
 †Chaunograptus
 †Chondrites
 †Chonetes
  †Cincinnetina
 †Cincinnetina meeki
 †Cincinnetina multisecta
 †Cladochonus
  †Cladoselache
 †Clarkesvillia
 †Climacograptus
 †Coenites
  †Colosteus
 †Columnaria
 †Columnaria calicina
 †Composita
 †Composita subtilita
 †Conchidium
  †Constellaria
 †Cordaites
 †Cordaites principalis – or unidentified comparable form
 †Cornulites
 †Cornulites flexuosus
 Craniella
 †Crepipora
 †Ctenacanthus
 †Ctenerpeton
  †Ctenospondylus
 †Cyclonema
 †Cyclopteris
 †Cypricardinia
 †Cypricardinia indenta
 †Cyrtolites
 †Cyrtospirifer
 †Cystodictya
 †Decadocrinus
 †Diceratosaurus
 †Diceratosaurus brevirostris – type locality for species
 †Dictyonema
 †Dinichthys
 †Dinichthys herzeri
  †Diploceraspis
 †Diplograptus
 Discina
 †Dolichopterus
  †Dunkleosteus
 †Ecdyceras
 †Edmondia
 †Edon
 †Eldredgeops
 †Eldredgeops rana
 †Elita
 †Elpe
 †Elrodoceras
 †Emmonsia
  †Endoceras
 †Erettopterus
 †Erpetosaurus
 †Eucalyptocrinites
 †Euomphalus
 †Euomphalus planodorsatus
  †Eurypterus
 †Eurypterus ornatus
 †Eusauropleura – type locality for genus
 †Faberia
 †Faberoceras
  †Favosites
 †Favosites discoideus
 †Favosites favosus
 †Favosites hisingeri
 †Favosites turbinatus
 †Fayettoceras
 †Fenestella
 †Flexicalymene
 †Flexicalymene meeki
 †Foerstia
 †Fusulina
 †Gilbertsocrinus
 †Glyptocrinus
  †Grewingkia
 †Grewingkia rusticum
 †Hallopora
 †Hallopora subnodosa
 †Halysites
 †Hamiltonella
 †Helcionopsis
 †Heliophyllum
 †Heliophyllum halli
 †Helminthochiton
 †Hexagonaria
 †Hexameroceras
 †Hindia
 †Holopea
 †Holoptychus – or unidentified comparable form
 †Hyolithes
 †Icriodus
 †Iocrinus
  †Isodectes
 †Isonema
  †Isotelus
 †Isotelus maximus
 †Kindleoceras
 †Kionoceras
 †Kockelella
 †Lambeoceras
 †Leiosphaeridia
  †Lepidodendron
 †Lepidodendron aculeatum
 Lingula
 †Liroceras – tentative report
 †Loxomma
 †Loxomma lintonensis – type locality for species
 †Maelonoceras
 †Manitoulinoceras
 †Manticoceras
 †Marsupiocrinus
  †Megalocephalus – type locality for genus
 †Megalocephalus lineolatus – type locality for species
 †Megalograptus
 †Metaxys
 †Michelinoceras
 Modiolus
 †Molgophis – type locality for genus
 †Mucrospirifer
 †Mucrospirifer grabaui – or unidentified comparable form
 †Mucrospirifer mucronatus
 †Mucrospirifer prolificus
 †Murchisonia
  †Naticopsis
 †Naticopsis comperta
 †Naticopsis levis
 †Neospirifer
 †Neospirifer cameratus
 †Neospirifer dunbari
 †Neuropteris
 †Neuropteris heterophylla
 †Neuropteris ovata
 †Neuropteris scheuchzeri
 †Nodonema
 Nucula
 † Nyassa
  †Odonterpeton – type locality for genus
 †Odonterpeton triangulare – type locality for species
 †Odontopleura
 †Oestocephalus – type locality for genus
 †Oestocephalus amphiuminum – type locality for species
 †Olenoides
 †Oncoceras
  †Ophiacodon
 †Ophiacodon uniformis – or unidentified comparable form
 †Orthoceras
 †Oulodus
 †Ozarkodina
 †Ozarkodina confluens
 †Paraspirifer
 †Pattersonia
  †Pecopteris
 †Pecopteris arborescens
 †Pecopteris hemitelioides
 †Pecopteris unita
 †Pentamerus
 †Petalodus
  †Phlegethontia – type locality for genus
 †Phlegethontia linearis – type locality for species
 †Phlegethontia longissima – type locality for species
 †Phragmolites
 †Phragmolites elegans – type locality for species
 †Phylloporina
 Pinna
 †Plaesiomys
  †Platyceras
 †Platyceras bucculentum
 †Platyceras carinatum
 †Platyceras rarispinum
 †Platyrhinops – type locality for genus
  †Platystrophia
 †Platystrophia acutilirata
 †Platystrophia annieana
 †Platystrophia clarksvillensis
 †Platystrophia cypha
 †Platystrophia moritura
 †Pleurodictyum
 †Pleuroptyx – type locality for genus
 †Pleurorthoceras
 †Poleumita
 †Polygnathus
 †Polygnathus eiflius
 †Polygnathus linguiformis
 †Polygnathus pseudofoliatus
 †Polygnathus xylus
 †Posidonia
 †Proetus
 †Protobalanus
 †Protosalvinia
  †Prototaxites
 †Pterochiton
 †Pterotheca
 †Pterygotus
 †Ptyonius
 †Ptyonius marshii – type locality for species
 †Pugnax
 †Reteocrinus
 †Rhizocorallium
 †Richmondoceras
 †Rusophycus
 †Samaropsis
  †Sauropleura – type locality for genus
 †Sauropleura pectinata – type locality for species
 †Sigillaria
 †Sigillaria brardii
 †Sigillaria elegans
 †Similodonta – tentative report
 Solemya
 †Solenomorpha
 †Sowerbyella
  †Sphenophyllum
 †Sphenophyllum majus
 †Sphenophyllum oblongifolium
 †Sphenopteris
 †Sphenopteris elegans – or unidentified comparable form
 †Sphenothallus
 †Spirifer
 †Spirifer opimus
 Spirorbis
 †Spyroceras
 †Stegops
  †Stethacanthus
 †Stethacanthus altonensis
 †Stigmatella
  †Strophomena
 †Strophomena concordensis
 †Strophomena erratica
 †Strophomena extenuata
 †Strophomena neglecta
 †Strophomena nutans
 †Strophomena planumbona
 †Strophomena sulcata
 †Stylonema
 †Subulites
 †Syntomopterus
 †Syringopora – tentative report
 †Teichichnus
 †Tentaculites
 †Tetradium
 †Tornoceras
 †Treptoceras
 †Triarthrus
 †Triendoceras – tentative report
 †Trocholites
  †Tuditanus – type locality for genus
 †Tuditanus punctulatus – type locality for species
  †Urasterella
 †Vinella
 †Walchia
 †Westonoceras
 †Whiteavesia
 †Wilkingia
 †Worthenia
 †Wurmiella
 †Wurmiella excavata
 †Xyloiulus
 †Zittelloceras
 †Zoophycos

Mesozoic

The Paleobiology Database records no known occurrences of Mesozoic fossils in Ohio.

Cenozoic

 Acella
 †Acella haldermani
 Amnicola
  †Arctodus
 †Arctodus simus
 †Bembidium
 †Bembidium fragmentum – type locality for species
 Castor
 †Castor canadensis
  †Castoroides
 †Castoroides ohioensis
 †Cervalces
 †Cervalces scotti
 Clethrionomys
 †Clethrionomys gapperi
 Equus
 Erethizon
 †Erethizon dorsatum
 Fossaria
 Gyraulus
 †Gyraulus deflectus
 †Gyraulus parvus
 Helisoma
 †Helisoma anceps
 Helophorus
 †Helophorus rigescens – type locality for species
 †Hydrochus
 †Hydrochus amictus – type locality for species
 Lucina
 Lymnaea
 †Mammut
  †Mammut americanum
  †Megalonyx
 †Megalonyx jeffersonii
 †Meomphix
 Microtus
 †Microtus xanthognathus
 Mictomys
 †Mictomys borealis
 Mustela
 †Mustela americana
 †Mustela richardsonii
 Odocoileus
  †Odocoileus virginianus
 Ondatra
 †Ondatra zibethicus
  Pekania
 †Pekania pennanti
 Phenacomys
 †Phenacomys intermedius
 Physa
 †Physa heterostropha – or unidentified comparable form
 Picea
 Planorbis
  †Platygonus
 †Platygonus compressus
 Promenetus
 †Promenetus exacuous
 Pterostichus
 †Pterostichus dormitans – type locality for species
 Rangifer
  †Rangifer tarandus
 Sorex
 †Sorex cinereus
 †Sorex hoyi
 Sphaerium
 Stagnicola
 †Stagnicola lanceata
 Ursus
  †Ursus arctos – type locality for species
 Valvata
 †Valvata tricarinata

References
 

Ohio
Ohio-related lists